Eurysolen  is a genus of flowering plant in the family Lamiaceae, first described in 1898. It contains only one known species, Eurysolen gracilis. It is native to southern China (Yunnan Province), Assam, Myanmar, Thailand, and western Indonesia.

References

Lamiaceae
Flora of China
Flora of tropical Asia
Monotypic Lamiaceae genera